Anyinasuso is a community near Tepa in the Ahafo Ano North Municipality in the Ashanti Region of Ghana.

References 

Ashanti Region
Communities in Ghana